Renée Dupuis (born January 17, 1949) is a Canadian lawyer and an independent member of the Senate of Canada. Dupuis specialized in Canadian administrative law, Human rights law, and Canadian Indigenous law. She was chosen for appointment to the Senate on November 2, 2016, by Prime Minister Justin Trudeau.

Dupuis has been a legal advisor and consultant for First Nations organizations in negotiating tripartite comprehensive claims and in constitutional negotiations. She chaired the Indian Specific Claims Commission, a federal commission of inquiry, and the Barreau du Québec's committee on the rights of Aboriginal peoples.

She was appointed the vice-president of the Commission on Human Rights and Youth Rights of Quebec in 2011, was a member of the Canadian Human Rights Act Review Panel and served as a commissioner with the Canadian Human Rights Commission.

In 2001, she won the Governor General's Award for French-language non-fiction in 2001 for her book “Justice for Canada’s Aboriginal Peoples.”

References

External links

1949 births
Canadian senators from Quebec
Women members of the Senate of Canada
Independent Canadian senators
Lawyers in Quebec
Living people
21st-century Canadian politicians
21st-century Canadian women politicians
Independent Senators Group
Governor General's Award-winning non-fiction writers
Université Laval Faculté de droit alumni